The Brent–Kung adder (BKA or BK), proposed in 1982, is an advanced binary adder design, having a gate level depth of .

Introduction
The Brent–Kung adder is a parallel prefix adder (PPA) form of carry-lookahead adder (CLA). Proposed by Richard Peirce Brent and Hsiang Te Kung in 1982 it introduced higher regularity to the adder structure and has less wiring congestion leading to better performance and less necessary chip area to implement compared to the Kogge–Stone adder (KSA). It is also much quicker than ripple-carry adders (RCA).

Ripple-carry adders were the initial multi-bit adders which were developed in the early days and got their name from the ripple effect which the carry made while being propagated from right to left. The time taken for addition was directly proportional to the length of the bit being added. This is reverse in Brent–Kung adders where the carry is calculated in parallel thus reducing the addition time drastically. Further work has been done on Brent–Kung adders and other parallel adders to reduce the power consumption and chip area as well as to increase the speed thus making them suitable for low-power designs.

A Brent–Kung adder is a parallel adder made in a regular layout with an aim of minimizing the chip area and ease of manufacturing. The addition of n-bit number can be performed in time  with a chip size of area  thus making it a good-choice adder with constraints on area and maximizing the performance. Its symmetry and regular build structure reduces costs of production effectively and enable it to be used in pipeline architectures.  In parallel adders the critical path is decided by computation of the carry from least significant bit (LSB) adder to the most significant bit (MSB) adder, therefore efforts are in reducing the critical path for the carry to reach the MSB.

Basic model outline
In general, most of the adders use carry-in and the corresponding bits of two numbers (A and B) to get the corresponding sum bit and carry-out - with ripple carry adders taking  time for carry to reach MSB.

 Considering that A = an an-1 … a1 and B = bn bn-1 … b1 both be n-bit binary numbers.
 With sum being S = sn+1 sn … s1 and carry generated in each stage C = cn … c0 will be carry-in to next stages.

 For RCA, c0 = 0, and i the sum bit and carry bit generated are ci = gi ∨ (ai ∧ ci-1) ∨ (bi ∧ ci-1),si = ai ⊕ bi ⊕ ci-1 for i = 1, 2, … nsn+1 = cn respectively.
 It is possible to transform the above ripple carry into carry-lookahead (CLA) by defining the carry bit i as c0 = 0, ci = gi ∨ (pi ∧ ci-1) where gi = ai ∧ bi and pi = ai ⊕ bi for i = 1, 2, … n. p and g are known as carry propagate and carry generate. This corresponds to the fact that the carry ci is either generated by ai and bi or propagated from the previous carry ci-1.

Brent and Kung further transformed the carry generation and propagation by defining an operator o as(a1, b1) o (a2, b2) = (a1 ∨ (b1 ∧ a2), b1 ∧ b2).
 They also defined a function (Gi, Pi) = (g1, p1) for i = 1;otherwise (gi, pi) o (Gi-1, Pi-1) for i = 2, 3, … n. It can be derived that Gi in the function is equivalent to ci. Also (Gn, Pn) can be non-recursively written as = (gn, pn) o (gn-1, pn-1) o … o (g1, p1).
Taking advantage of the associativity of operator o (Gn, Pn) can be computed in a tree-like manner.

The design of the white nodes is obvious as they are just buffering the gi's and pi's, and the black nodes are performing operation defined by operator o, which is similar to a one bit adder. 
 This tree-like propagation of carry reduces its critical path to that of tree height. The tree-based layout also reduces the chip area and redundant wiring required in general CLA-based adders.

Final processing stage
Using the carry propagation and generation transformation for working out addition and carry used by Brent and Kung, the performance of the adder increases considerably and also leads to an increase in regularity. The final sum can be calculated as follows: si = pi ⊕ Gi-1, since pi = ai ⊕ bi and Gi-1 = ci-1.

Low-power adder
The increase in performance in Brent–Kung adders is attributed to its tree structure of carry propagation which also leads to lower power consumption as the carry signal now has to travel through fewer stages, leading to less switching of transistors. Also, the decrease in amount of wiring and fan-out also contributes largely to its lower power consumption than CLA adders. A Brent–Kung adder can also be used in a pipeline manner which can further reduce the power consumption by reducing the depth of combinatorial logic and glitches stabilization. The graph shows a low-power Brent–Kung adder.

Comparison with Kogge–Stone adder

Advantages
Due to this type of adder requiring fewer modules to implement than the Kogge–Stone adder, the Brent–Kung adder is much simpler to build. It also contains far fewer connections to other modules, which also contributes to its simplicity.

Disadvantages
One major disadvantage of this adder is fan-out. Fan-out may split and weaken the current propagating through the adder. This may be solved by adding buffering circuitry at cost of speed.

Equations
8-bit Kogge-Stone adder, valency-2:
 P00 = A0 XOR B0              '1dt, S0
 G00 = A0 AND B0              '1dt, C0
 P10 = A1 XOR B1              '1dt  
 G10 = A1 AND B1              '1dt 
 P20 = A2 XOR B2              '1dt
 G20 = A2 AND B2              '1dt 
 P30 = A3 XOR B3              '1dt
 G30 = A3 AND B3              '1dt
 P40 = A4 XOR B4              '1dt
 G40 = A4 AND B4              '1dt
 P50 = A5 XOR B5              '1dt
 G50 = A5 AND B5              '1dt  
 P60 = A6 XOR B6              '1dt
 G60 = A6 AND B6              '1dt
 P70 = A7 XOR B7              '1dt
 G70 = A7 AND B7              '1dt
 
 G11 = G10 OR (P10 AND G00)   '3dt, C1
 P21 = P20 AND P10            '2dt
 G21 = G20 OR (P20 AND G10)   '3dt
 P31 = P30 AND P20            '2dt
 G31 = G30 OR (P30 AND G20)   '3dt
 P41 = P40 AND P30            '2dt 
 G41 = G40 OR (P40 AND G30)   '3dt
 P51 = P50 AND P40            '2dt
 G51 = G50 OR (P50 AND G40)   '3dt
 P61 = P60 AND P50            '2dt
 G61 = G60 OR (P60 AND G50)   '3dt
 P71 = P70 AND P60            '2dt
 G71 = G70 OR (P70 AND G60)   '3dt
 
 G22 = G21 OR (P21 AND G00)   '5dt, C2
 G32 = G31 OR (P31 AND G11)   '5dt, C3
 P42 = P41 AND P21            '4dt
 G42 = G41 OR (P41 AND G21)   '5dt
 P52 = P51 AND P31            '4dt 
 G52 = G51 OR (P51 AND G31)   '5dt
 P62 = P61 AND P41            '4dt
 G62 = G61 OR (P61 AND G41)   '5dt
 P72 = P71 AND P51            '4dt
 G72 = G71 OR (P71 AND G51)   '5dt
 
 G43 = G42 OR (P42 AND G00)   '7dt, C4
 G53 = G52 OR (P52 AND G11)   '7dt, C5
 G63 = G62 OR (P62 AND G22)   '7dt, C6
 G73 = G72 OR (P72 AND G32)   '7dt, C7, Cout
 
 S0 = P00                     '1dt
 S1 = P10 XOR G00             '2dt
 S2 = P20 XOR G11             '4dt
 S3 = P30 XOR G22             '6dt
 S4 = P40 XOR G32             '6dt
 S5 = P50 XOR G43             '8dt
 S6 = P60 XOR G53             '8dt
 S7 = P70 XOR G63             '8dt
8-bit Kogge-Stone adder, valency-2,3,4:
 P00 = A0 XOR B0                    '1dt, S0
 G00 = A0 AND B0                    '1dt, C0
 P10 = A1 XOR B1                    '1dt
 G10 = A1 AND B1                    '1dt
 P20 = A2 XOR B2                    '1dt
 G20 = A2 AND B2                    '1dt
 P30 = A3 XOR B3                    '1dt
 G30 = A3 AND B3                    '1dt
 P40 = A4 XOR B4                    '1dt
 G40 = A4 AND B4                    '1dt
 P50 = A5 XOR B5                    '1dt
 G50 = A5 AND B5                    '1dt
 P60 = A6 XOR B6                    '1dt
 G60 = A6 AND B6                    '1dt
 P70 = A7 XOR B7                    '1dt
 G70 = A7 AND B7                    '1dt
 
 G11 = G10 OR (P10 AND G00)         '3dt, distance=2^0=1, valency-2, C1
 P21 = P20 AND P10                  '2dt
 G21 = G20 OR (P20 AND G10)         '3dt, distance=2^0=1, valency-2
 P31 = P30 AND P20                  '2dt
 G31 = G30 OR (P30 AND G20)         '3dt, distance=2^0=1, valency-2
 P41 = P40 AND P30                  '2dt
 G41 = G40 OR (P40 AND G30)         '3dt, distance=2^0=1, valency-2
 P51 = P50 AND P40                  '2dt
 G51 = G50 OR (P50 AND G40)         '3dt, distance=2^0=1, valency-2
 P61 = P60 AND P50                  '2dt
 G61 = G60 OR (P60 AND G50)         '3dt, distance=2^0=1, valency-2
 P71 = P70 AND P60                  '2dt
 G71 = G70 OR (P70 AND G60)         '3dt, distance=2^0=1, valency-2
 
 G22 = G20 OR_
      (P20 AND G10) OR_
      (P20 AND P10 AND G00)         '3dt, distance=2^1=2, valency-3, C2
 G32 = G30 OR_
      (P30 AND G20) OR_
      (P30 AND P20 AND G10) OR_
      (P30 AND P20 AND P10 AND G00) '3dt, distance=2^1=2, valency-4, C3
 P42 = P41 AND P21                  '3dt, distance=2^1=2
 G42 = G40 OR_
      (P40 AND G30) OR_
      (P40 AND P30 AND G20) OR_
      (P40 AND P30 AND P20 AND G10) '3dt, distance=2^1=2, valency-4
 P52 = P51 AND P31                  '3dt, distance=2^1=2
 G52 = G50 OR_
      (P50 AND G40) OR_
      (P50 AND P40 AND G30) OR_
      (P50 AND P40 AND P30 AND G20) '3dt, distance=2^1=2, valency-4
 P62 = P61 AND P41                  '3dt, distance=2^1=2
 G62 = G60 OR_
      (P60 AND G50) OR_
      (P60 AND P50 AND G40) OR_
      (P60 AND P50 AND P40 AND G30) '3dt, distance=2^1=2, valency-4
 P72 = P71 AND P51
 G72 = G70 OR_
      (P70 AND G60) OR_
      (P70 AND P60 AND G50) OR_
      (P70 AND P60 AND P50 AND G40) '3dt, distance=2^1=2, valency-4
 
 G43 = G42 OR (P42 AND G00)         '5dt, distance=2^2=4, valency-2, C4
 G53 = G52 OR (P52 AND G11)         '5dt, distance=2^2=4, valency-2, C5
 G63 = G62 OR (P62 AND G22)         '5dt, distance=2^2=4, valency-2, C6
 G73 = G72 OR (P72 AND G32)         '5dt, distance=2^2=4, valency-2, C7
 
 S0 = P00                           '1dt
 S1 = P10 XOR G00                   '2dt
 S2 = P20 XOR G11                   '4dt
 S3 = P30 XOR G22                   '4dt
 S4 = P40 XOR G32                   '6dt
 S5 = P50 XOR G43                   '6dt
 S6 = P60 XOR G53                   '6dt
 S7 = P70 XOR G63                   '6dt
8-bit Brent-Kung adder, valency-2:
 P00 = A0 XOR B0              '1dt, S0
 G00 = A0 AND B0              '1dt, C0
 P10 = A1 XOR B1              '1dt
 G10 = A1 AND B1              '1dt
 P20 = A2 XOR B2              '1dt
 G20 = A2 AND B2              '1dt
 P30 = A3 XOR B3              '1dt
 G30 = A3 AND B3              '1dt
 P40 = A4 XOR B4              '1dt
 G40 = A4 AND B4              '1dt
 P50 = A5 XOR B5              '1dt
 G50 = A5 AND B5              '1dt
 P60 = A6 XOR B6              '1dt
 G60 = A6 AND B6              '1dt
 P70 = A7 XOR B7              '1dt
 G70 = A7 AND B7              '1dt
 
 G11 = G10 OR (P10 AND G00)   '3dt, C1
 G21 = G20 OR (P20 AND G11)   '3dt, C2
 P31 = P30 AND P20            '2dt 
 G31 = G30 OR (P30 AND G20)   '3dt
 P51 = P50 AND P40            '2dt  
 G51 = G50 OR (P50 AND G40)   '3dt
 P71 = P70 AND P60            '2dt  
 G71 = G70 OR (P70 AND G60)   '3dt
 
 G32 = G31 OR (P31 AND G11)   '5dt, C3
 P72 = P71 AND P51            '3dt 
 G72 = G71 OR (P71 AND G51)   '5dt  
 
 G53 = G51 OR (P51 AND G32)   '7dt, C5
 G73 = G72 OR (P72 AND G32)   '7dt, C7, Cout
 
 G44 = G40 OR (P40 AND G32)   '7dt, C4
 G64 = G60 OR (P60 AND G53)   '9dt, C6
 
 S0 = P00                     '1dt   
 S1 = P10 XOR G00             '2dt
 S2 = P20 XOR G11             '4dt
 S3 = P30 XOR G21             '4dt
 S4 = P40 XOR G32             '6dt
 S5 = P50 XOR G44             '8dt
 S6 = P60 XOR G53             '8dt 
 S7 = P70 XOR G64            '10dt

References

Further reading

External links
 

Adders (electronics)